Additional Inspector General of Police Safwat Ghayur (14 July 1959 – 4 August 2010) was a senior two-star police officer serving in the Khyber Pakhtunkhwa Province of Pakistan as commandant of the Frontier Constabulary. He was a respected police officer, and a leader in the country's fight against terrorism, he was martyred  in a suicide attack by the Pakistani Taliban.

Biography
Safwat Ghayur was the nephew of Pakistan Movement activist Sardar Abdur Rab Nishtar, a cousin of the former Governor of Khyber Pakhtunkhwa, Owais Ahmed Ghani and a cousin of former Chief of Armed forces General Abdul Waheed Kakar. His brother-in-law, Aftab Ahmad Khan Sherpao, was twice the Chief Minister of the erstwhile pakhtunkhwa, as well as Interior Minister of Pakistan.. He is an ethnic Pashtun, hailing from Kakar tribe in Zhob. Safwat Ghayur is the son of Abdul Ghayur, the Pakistani Ambassador to Thailand, where Safwat Ghayur spent his adolescence. Safwat Ghayur was an avid Badminton Player who could be frequently seen on the Badminton Courts of the Royal Bangkok Sports Club (RBSC) playing Badminton on a daily basis with his close childhood friend, Homayoun Sadigh Esfandiary son of Mohsen Sadigh Esfandiary, the Iranian Ambassador to Thailand.

Safwat Ghayur joined the Police Service of Pakistan in 1981(9th CTP) and worked initially as an Assistant Superintendent of Police (ASP), at various stations of Peshawar, and then as Senior Superintendent of Police (SSP) of Peshawar. He became Deputy Commandant in the National Police Academy of Pakistan and later on Capital City Police Officer of Peshawar. Since December 2009, he served as Commandant of the Frontier Constabulary, which acts as a policing force in the semi-autonomous tribal areas of Pakistan. He had gained a reputation for being actively involved in police work, having been shot in the shoulder in 1994 in a shootout with a criminal, and was widely praised as a hero and became a respected police officer, and a leader in the fight against terrorism.

Death and legacy
Safwat Ghayur was killed by a targeted suicide bomb blast at the Frontier Constabulary Chowk, Peshawar on the evening of 4 August 2010, when he was driving away from his office without any special security protocol. A pedestrian was killed on the scene and two others later died in the hospital. Eight kilograms of explosives were used; "the severed head of the suspected bomber, who appeared to be in his teens, was found some 20 feet from the gutted vehicle of Mr Ghayur." Responsibility was claimed by Tehrik-i-Taliban Pakistan.

Interior Minister of Pakistan Rehman Malik honoured him posthumously with the Hilal-e-Shujaat. His loss was yet another blow to the Khyber-Pakhtunkhwa Police; following his colleagues Malik Saad and Abid Ali in keeping the tradition of self-sacrifice for the greater good of the community going.

See also
Tahir Dawar
Malik Saad

References

External links
 Mohsin-e-Peshawar — Sifwat Ghayur
 A hero who died with his boots on
 Watch drama on Commandant FC Safwat Ghayur Shaheed | Awam Kay Sipahi (2017)

Pakistani police officers
1959 births
2010 deaths
Pashtun people
People from Peshawar
Insurgency in Khyber Pakhtunkhwa casualties
Edwardes College alumni